Marcel Thibaud (22 September 1896 in Unieux – 1 July 1985) was a French politician. He represented the French Communist Party in the National Assembly from 1956 to 1958.

References

1896 births
1985 deaths
People from Loire (department)
Politicians from Auvergne-Rhône-Alpes
French Communist Party politicians
Deputies of the 3rd National Assembly of the French Fourth Republic
French military personnel of World War I
French military personnel of World War II